The 2019 PDC Unicorn Challenge Tour consisted of 20 darts tournaments on the 2019 PDC Pro Tour.

Prize money
The prize money for the Challenge Tour events remained the same from 2018, with each event having a prize fund of £10,000.

This is how the prize money is divided:

January

Challenge Tour 1
Challenge Tour 1 was contested on Saturday 26 January 2019 at the Robin Park Tennis Centre in Wigan.

Challenge Tour 2
Challenge Tour 2 was contested on Saturday 26 January 2019 at the Robin Park Tennis Centre in Wigan.

Challenge Tour 3
Challenge Tour 3 was contested on Sunday 27 January 2019 at the Robin Park Tennis Centre in Wigan.

Challenge Tour 4
Challenge Tour 4 was contested on Sunday 27 January 2019 at the Robin Park Tennis Centre in Wigan.

May

Challenge Tour 5
Challenge Tour 5 was contested on Saturday 11 May 2019 at the Robin Park Tennis Centre in Wigan.

Challenge Tour 6
Challenge Tour 6 was contested on Saturday 11 May 2019 at the Robin Park Tennis Centre in Wigan.

Challenge Tour 7
Challenge Tour 7 was contested on Sunday 12 May 2019 at the Robin Park Tennis Centre in Wigan.

Challenge Tour 8
Challenge Tour 8 was contested on Sunday 12 May 2019 at the Robin Park Tennis Centre in Wigan.

July

Challenge Tour 9
Challenge Tour 9 was contested on Saturday 13 July 2019 at the East of England Showground in Peterborough.

Challenge Tour 10
Challenge Tour 10 was contested on Saturday 13 July 2019 at the East of England Showground in Peterborough.

Challenge Tour 11
Challenge Tour 11 was contested on Sunday 14 July 2019 at the East of England Showground in Peterborough.

Challenge Tour 12
Challenge Tour 12 was contested on Sunday 14 July 2019 at the East of England Showground in Peterborough.

August

Challenge Tour 13
Challenge Tour 13 was contested on Saturday 10 August 2019 at the Aldersley Leisure Village in Wolverhampton.

Challenge Tour 14
Challenge Tour 14 was contested on Saturday 10 August 2019 at the Aldersley Leisure Village in Wolverhampton.

Challenge Tour 15
Challenge Tour 15 was contested on Sunday 11 August 2019 at the Aldersley Leisure Village in Wolverhampton.

Challenge Tour 16
Challenge Tour 16 was contested on Sunday 11 August 2019 at the Aldersley Leisure Village in Wolverhampton.

September

Challenge Tour 17
Challenge Tour 17 was contested on Saturday 28 September 2019 at the Robin Park Tennis Centre in Wigan.

Challenge Tour 18
Challenge Tour 18 was contested on Sunday 29 September 2019 at the Robin Park Tennis Centre in Wigan.

Challenge Tour 19
Challenge Tour 19 was contested on Sunday 29 September 2019 at the Robin Park Tennis Centre in Wigan.

Challenge Tour 20
Challenge Tour 20 was contested on Sunday 29 September 2019 at the Robin Park Tennis Centre in Wigan.

References

2019 in darts
2019 PDC Pro Tour